The 2016 Primeira Liga is the first edition of a football competition held in Brazil. Featuring 12 clubs, the Minas Gerais and Santa Catarina leagues provide three entrants, while Rio de Janeiro, Rio Grande do Sul and Paraná provide two each.

Qualified teams

Group stage

Group A

Group B

Group C

Ranking of second placed teams

Knockout stage

Semi-finals

Final

References

Primeira Liga
Primeira Liga